Progonostola is a genus of moths in the family Geometridae, native to Hawaii.

Species 
Progonostola caustoscia Meyrick, 1899  
Progonostola cremnopis Meyrick, 1899

References
Natural History Museum Lepidoptera genus database

Larentiinae
Geometridae genera